Navya is an Indian television drama series that aired on Star Plus from 4 April 2011 and ended on 29 June 2012. It was produced by Swastik Pictures which starred Soumya Seth in the titular role-Navya and Shaheer Sheikh as Anant in the lead roles. The song Dhin Tanna was sung by Supriya Joshi.

Summary
The show narrates the fresh love story of college students Anant Bajpai, and Navya Mishra.

Amidst riots on Valentine's Day in Mumbai, Anant saves Navya from a goon. They further befriend each other in college and mutually begin to develop feelings. Their romance is hidden and they have to constantly keep sneaking in and out to meet and spend time together, as both of their families have traditional conservative values.

Anant is the grandson of Shankar Dayal Bajpai, a man of renowned religious fame and power, while Navya hails from a middle-class family from Kanpur. When the families find out about Anant and Navya, they disapprove of the alliance but ultimately agree to Anant and Navya's love and determination.

The Bajpais, however, continue to plot against Navya and try to prove her unsuitable for Anant. Seeing this, Anant and Navya leave the Bajpai house, and settle in a small flat, working two jobs to make ends meet and struggling with each other's busy routines.

The Mishras support the couple, and try to make Anant's parents realise his grandfather's schemes. Navya finally manages to expose the truth about Shankar Dayal Bajpai and his sister Saraswati, and even Anant's strict father stands up for Navya and Anant. Shankar Dayal apologises, and Anant and Navya finally return home.

Cast

Main
 Soumya Seth as Navya Mishra-Bajpai, 21: Daughter of the Mishras, Anant's wife. She is a righteous, and modern girl, who values her family and relations. She tries her best to adjust with the Bajpais, and also corrects them when necessary. 
Shaheer Sheikh as Anant Bajpai, 22. The Bajpais' youngest son, Navya's husband. He is a modern, young boy, struggling to break free from his traditional household. He supports Navya throughout, and opposes his family's manipulative behaviour.

Recurring
 Gireesh Sahedev as Deepak Mishra, 51. Navya's father. He is a loving and protective father, and wishes to educate his children so they can live happily. He is against the idea of young love, but eventually supports Anant and Navya, after his eldest daughter's arranged marriage collapses.
 Shankar Dayal Bajpai, 71. Anant's grandfather. He is the patriarch of the Bajpai family, and is a dogmatic religious man. He suppresses free speech and modernity, and often manipulates his family members to have his way.
 Kshitee Jog as Meeta Mishra, 48. Navya's mother. She is a supportive mother, who tries her best to balance her duty and love towards her husband and children.
 Daadi ji, 68. Deepak's mother. She is a traditional, but loving and humorous grandmother, but favours her grandson, and wishes for her granddaughters to marry as soon as possible.
 Shruti Sharma as Renuka Mishra, 23. Navya's elder sister. She is the oldest sibling, and is married very early. She gives birth to a daughter, and later divorces her husband for domestic violence and infidelity.
 Achal Nagesh as Om Prakash Bajpai, 55. Anant's father. He is a successful businessman, but arrogant towards his family. He worships his father, and always obeys him in order to make him proud.
 Hemaakshi Ujjain as Sugandha Bajpai, 53. Anant's mother. She believes in her duty as a daughter-in-law, and often fails to speak up as a mother and a sister, even though she loves and supports Anant's decisions.
 Rohit Bharadwaj as Mohan Bajpai, 24. Anant's brother. He is similar to Sanjay, but fails to show his defiance to his elders' views, and remains silent.
 Snigdha Pandey as Rama Bajpai, 23. Mohan's wife. She is a greedy, but obedient wife and daughter-in-law. She tries to get her sister married to Anant, so they can win over the household.
 Farukh Saeed as Sanjay Bajpai, 52. Anant's uncle. He is a simple, and down-to-earth man. He disagrees with his father's and brother's materialistic views, and likes to spend time gardening. He earns little, and is constantly rebuked by his wife. He loves his daughter Nimisha, and wants to provide her with a good life.
 Savita Bajpai, 50. Sanjay's wife. She is a dutiful daughter-in-law, but dislikes her husband's alienation from the rest of the Bajpais. She is also Sugandha's younger sister and adores her, and wants her daughter to be traditional and disciplined.
 Shivani Surve as Nimisha Bajpai, 18. Sanjay's daughter. She is a chirpy and strategic but rebellious girl, who adores and supports Anant in his decisions. She is soon betrothed to Nikhil, as the Bajpais believe in getting their daughters married early. Due to some wrong reasons, Nimmisha called off her engagement with Nikhil. She later develops a relationship with Ranbir.
 Vinita Joshi Thakkar as Ritika Joshi, 21. Navya's best friend. She is bold and lively. She initially dates Ranbir for a long time, but they later fight and break up. She supports and shelters Anant and Navya when they leave the Bajpais.
 Farhina Parvez Jarimari as Appy, 21. Navya's best friend. She knows Navya since they were toddlers. She is chirpy and encouraging, but is sometimes anxious, and tries to warn Navya of the consequences.
 Rehan Sayed as Ranbir, 21. Anant's best friend. He is sweet and calm. He is Ritika's boyfriend when the show begins, but they break up. He later develops a relationship with Nimisha.
 Meer Ali as Harry, 20. Anant's friend. He is introduced later in the show as Anant and Ranbir's energetic friend, who accompanies them to camps and trips.
 Danica Moadi as Shagun, 19. Rama's sister. She is a dreamy, naïve girl who is easily manipulated. Rama introduces her as a fiancée for Anant, but soon the family finds out about Anant and Navya, and their engagement is cancelled.
 Chestha Bhagat as Sonia, 21. Anant's lover. She is obsessed with Anant, and feels jealous and dejected when he ignores her advances and she sees him helping Navya. She is introduced in the initial episodes, and threatens Anant with suicide if he does not accept her. Navya and Anant help her, and she leaves them.

Production

Development
The title track of the series was composed by singers Vishal Dadlani and Shekhar Ravjiani.

Cancellation
The series, due to its average ratings of 2-3 TVR, was finalized to go off air on 13 February 2012. However, when it slightly increased averaging 3 TVR while nearing the end, the channel, on audience request, cancelled its end in the last minute and shifted the series to an evening slot of 6:00pm from its prime slot of 10:00pm (IST) on 14 February 2012. However, it went off air on 29 June 2012.

Reception
The Indian Express rated three stars and applauded the series as a fresh concept stating, "What works for Navya are its simple characters, especially the two protagonists. The tender moments between Navya and her father, the typical mother-daughter relationship or Anant's equation with his grandfather lends a warm touch to the show. The only hitch is its slow pace."

The series opened with a rating of 3.85 TVR in the launch week, occupying ninth position in list of the ten most watched Hindi programmes of that week.

The series in its runtime had an average rating averaged about 2 TVR and sometimes 3 TVR while airing at 10:00pm (IST). However, soon it saw a dip in viewership in the slot and when changed to the evening slot, it did not deliver expected ratings in that slot and thus was canceled by the channel on 29 June 2012.

Awards

References

External links
 Navya..Naye Dhadkan Naye Sawaal Streaming on Hotstar

StarPlus original programming
Indian drama television series
2011 Indian television series debuts
2012 Indian television series endings
Swastik Productions television series